John Jansen (born August 26, 1963 in Veldhoven) is a retired water polo player from the Netherlands, who finished in ninth position with the Dutch team at the 1992 Summer Olympics in Barcelona.

References
 Dutch Olympic Committee

External links
 

1963 births
Living people
Dutch male water polo players
Olympic water polo players of the Netherlands
People from Veldhoven
Water polo players at the 1992 Summer Olympics
Sportspeople from North Brabant
20th-century Dutch people